Michel David (born in 1951) has been a Québécois journalist since 1978, and is a columnist for the Montreal, Quebec, Canada, newspaper Le Devoir.

David was parliamentary correspondent at the National Assembly of Quebec for Quebec City's Le Soleil from 1980 to 1991 and became President of the press gallery at the end of the 1980s. From 1994 to 2001, he was a regular contributor to the English-language Montreal paper The Gazette. Now a columnist for the newspaper Le Devoir, he contributes each year to its publication of a bulletin (report card), giving grades to prominent Members of the National Assembly for their work during the year. His columns tend to show subtle humour and slight cynicism.

After the 2001 resignation of Lucien Bouchard he published, with Quebec City cartoonist André-Philippe Côté, Les années Bouchard, a book on the former Parti Québécois Premier of Quebec. The book compiled political cartoons of Bouchard drawn by Côté; David provided commentaries and Bouchard, himself, the foreword.

See also 
List of Quebec media
Politics of Quebec

References

Journalists from Montreal
1951 births
Living people
Le Devoir people